Only eight of the 14 Massachusetts incumbents were re-elected.

Massachusetts redistricted between the 3rd and 4th Congress, dividing itself into 14 districts. The -s were in the District of Maine (the modern state of Maine). A majority was required for election. Additional ballots were required in five districts due to the majority requirement not being met on the first ballot.

|-
| 
| Theodore Sedgwick
|  | Pro-Administration
| 1789
|  | Incumbent re-elected to a new party.Federalist gain.
| nowrap | 

|-
| 
| William Lyman
|  | Anti-Administration
| 1792
|  | Incumbent re-elected to a new party.Democratic-Republican gain.
| nowrap | 

|-
| 
| colspan=3 | None (district created)
|  | New seat.New member elected.Federalist gain.
| nowrap | 

|-
| 
| Dwight Foster
|  | Pro-Administration
| 1792
|  | Incumbent re-elected to a new party.Federalist gain.
| nowrap | 

|-
| 
| Peleg Coffin Jr.
|  | Pro-Administration
| 1792
|  | Incumbent lost re-election.New member elected.Democratic-Republican gain.
| nowrap | 

|-
| 
| colspan=3 | None (district created)
|  | New seat.New member elected.Federalist gain.
| nowrap | 

|-
| 
| David Cobb
|  | Pro-Administration
| 1792
|  | Incumbent lost re-election.New member elected.Federalist gain.
| nowrap | First ballot:Second ballot:Third ballot:Fourth ballot:

|-
| 
| Fisher Ames
|  | Pro-Administration
| 1788
|  | Incumbent re-elected to a new party.Federalist gain.
| nowrap | 

|-
| 
| Samuel Dexter
|  | Pro-Administration
| 1792
|  | Incumbent lost re-election.New member elected.Democratic-Republican gain.
| nowrap | First ballot:Second ballot:Third ballot:

|-
| rowspan=2 | 
| Benjamin Goodhue
|  | Pro-Administration
| 1789
|  | Incumbent re-elected to a new party.Federalist gain.
| rowspan=2 nowrap | 

|-
| Samuel Holten
|  | Anti-Administration
| 1792
|  | Incumbent lost re-election in a redistricting contest.Federalist loss.

|-
| 
| colspan=3 | None (district created)
|  | New seat.New member elected.Federalist gain.
| nowrap | First ballot:Second ballot:Third ballot:

|-
| 
| Henry Dearborn
|  | Anti-Administration
| 1792
|  | Incumbent re-elected to a new party.Democratic-Republican gain.
| nowrap | 

|-
| 
| Peleg Wadsworth
|  | Pro-Administration
| 1792
|  | Incumbent re-elected to a new party.Federalist gain.
| nowrap | First ballot:Second ballot:

|-
| 
| George Thatcher
|  | Pro-Administration
| 1788
|  | Incumbent re-elected to a new party.Federalist gain.
| nowrap | First ballot:Second ballot:

|}

Notes

References

See also 
 List of United States representatives from Massachusetts
 1794 and 1795 United States House of Representatives elections

United States House of Representatives elections in Massachusetts
Massachusetts
United States House of Representatives
Massachusetts
United States House of Representatives